Sword at Sunset is a best-selling 1963 novel by Rosemary Sutcliff. One of her few historical novels written specifically for adults, it is her interpretation of the legend of King Arthur.

This is the first novel that Sutcliff wrote using a first-person singular point of view for her story.  In an interview with Raymond H. Thompson (in 1986), she explained that she actually spent the eighteen months while writing this story thinking like a man and felt that the story was being fed to her.

Unlike most of the series The Eagle of the Ninth, it does not follow either the inheritor of the dolphin seal ring or the person who will eventually marry said inheritor; although the current inheritor, the son of the protagonist of The Lantern Bearers, is a minor character in the book, the action follows the character of Artos (Arthur) as established in The Lantern Bearers.

Plot
The events of the novel follow and continue those of The Lantern Bearers. Artos (Sutcliff's version of Arthur) recalls his life as he lies near death, from the time when he served under his uncle, the British high king Ambrosius. He gathers a core cavalry group, Artos' Companions, who will be pivotal to the resistance of the British kingdoms to the invading Saxons. While visiting Arfon, in North Wales, where he grew up, Artos meets a woman, Ygerna, who drugs and seduces him. He is unaware that the woman is his half-sister, and that her seduction was a deliberate plan to gain revenge against their father; Ygerna is Uther's daughter, whereas Artos is Uther's illegitimate son. Artos' seduction and the conception of Medraut is Ygerna's means of bringing ruin to Artos.

Artos marries Guenhumara in order to bolster his forces with much needed troops. His relationship with her is difficult as a result of his previous involvement with Ygerna, and his best friend Bedwyr eventually betrays Artos by his involvement with Artos' wife.

Sutcliff presents the Arthur legend in a realistic manner, portraying Arthur as a historical figure, and excluding the grail quest, Merlin and many of the more fantastic elements of the legend. However many elements, such as the death of his daughter being linked to a Celtic 'curse', retain magical elements, but linked to Celtic religious practices. Indeed, Artos is shown as a man of two worlds, part Romano British, the descendant of the Romanised city-dwelling peoples of the South of Britain and part descendant of the more Celtic tribes of the mountains of Wales and Southern Scotland. The tension between these two cultures influences Artos's character, and his seduction by Ygerna. The battles in particular are described realistically. The Battle of Badon Hill is set at the Vale of the White Horse at Uffington and was planned out with the aid of a military advisor.

The story removes Lancelot, and gives the friend-and-lover's role to Bedwyr (old Welsh form of the name Bedivere). The name Ygerna is related to Igraine but she plays the role similar to that of Morgause. Other characters familiar from Arthurian legend who are members of Arthur's Companions include Gwalchmai (Gawain) and Cei (Kay).

Adaptations
Sword at Sunset was adapted for the stage by playwright James Beagon and performed by the Edinburgh University Theatre Company from 25 February-1 March 2014 at Bedlam Theatre.

External links
 Interview with Rosemary Sutcliff by Raymond H.Thompson in 1986 Rosemary Sutcliff discusses her experience of writing Sword at Sunset
 Hic Jacet Arthurus Rex Quondam Rexque Futurus by Francis Brett Young. Sutcliff used this poem as the foreword for Sword at Sunset. In an interview with John Withrington, published in Quondam et Futurus, Vol.1, No. 4 (Winter, 1991) pp 53–60, she commented, "I had thought of, begun to think of, the reconstruction of the historical Arthur, and then I came across this poem....it sort of rang bells for me in all directions".
 Who's who: a list of the people and places mentioned in Sutcliff's Sword at Sunset
 Review of Sword at Sunset by Eric Eller at The Green Man Review website
 Official Rosemary Sutcliff website with more on book and author
 Interview with James Beagon about the stage adaptation of Sword at Sunset in 2014 Sample of interview with the Historical Novel Society.

References

Modern Arthurian fiction
1963 British novels
British historical novels
Novels by Rosemary Sutcliff
Novels set in sub-Roman Britain
Hodder & Stoughton books